Mallender is a surname. Notable people with the surname include:

Ken Mallender (born 1943), English footballer
Neil Mallender (born 1961), English cricketer

See also
Mallinder
Millender